New Hampshire Roller Derby is the first women's amateur roller derby league in New Hampshire. NHRD is a member of the Women's Flat Track Derby Association.

League history
The league was founded in July 2007 as Skate Free or Die Rollergirls, in southern New Hampshire, but now operates under the name New Hampshire Roller Derby.

In the summer of 2008, their Skate Free or Die! all-star team had their first scrimmage against Providence Roller Derby's Killah Bees in July, hosted their first tournament in August, and saw their first bout, against Maine Roller Derby's Calamity Janes, in September. The league played its first full-length season in 2009. (See Competitive History)

On September 1, 2009, NHRD was accepted into the WFTDA Apprenticeship Program with the first round of inductees. The league graduated from the Apprentice Program and was inducted as a Class B member of WFTDA on June 17, 2010.

Organization
The league is composed of several teams including an all-star travel team that competes with other leagues in the surrounding area. The league operates as a 501(c)(3) not-for-profit organization. All proceeds after paying operating costs such as venue rental fees are donated to charity. Groups that the New Hampshire Roller Derby has donated to include the American Red Cross, Animal Rescue League, NH Food Bank, Boston Area Rape Crisis Center, Save Giovanni's Friends, and Greyhound Pets of America.

Teams
New Hampshire Roller Derby had grown to more than 50 members by 2009, and has featured a variety of teams within the league beginning with the 2010 season.

Travel teams
The Skate Free or Die All-Stars (SFOD) were NHRD's only team for the first two-and-a-half years of the league's existence. SFOD functioned as the league's A-Level, WFTDA-chartered travel team, eligible for national ranking and participation in WFTDA tournaments. They have played bouts throughout the northeastern United States and southeastern Canada as far away as Delaware and Montreal. In 2015 SFOD changed their name to the New Hampshire Roller Derby All-Stars, still functioning as an A-Level, WFTDA-chartered travel team. The team's colors are pink and black.

Formed in early 2010, the Queen City Cherry Bombs (QCCB) are NHRD's B-Level travel team which competes around New England.

Former home teams
The Seabrook Meltdowns were formed in early 2010 but are since a retired team. They played intraleague home and exhibition bouts against the league's other home teams, the Granite Skate Troopers and the Nightmares on Elm Street. The team's colors were lime green and black.

Like the Meltdowns, and the Nightmares on Elm Street, the Granite Skate Troopers were one of NHRD's three intraleague home teams but are since a retired team. They played against the Meltdowns and Nightmares both at home and in exhibition bouts. The team's colors were green and gold.

Like the Meltdowns, and the Granite Skate Troopers, the Nightmares were one of NHRD's three intraleague home teams but are since a retired team. They played against the Meltdowns and Troopers both at home and in exhibition bouts. The team's colors were black and orange.

Competitive history

2009
Overall Record: 5-3

2010
Overall Record:
Skate Free or Die!: 4-3
Queen City Cherry Bombs: 3-2

Rankings

See also
List of roller derby leagues
Women's Flat Track Derby Association

References

External links
New Hampshire Roller Derby

Sports in Nashua, New Hampshire
Roller derby leagues established in 2007
Roller derby leagues in New Hampshire
Women's sports in the United States
Women's Flat Track Derby Association Division 3
2007 establishments in New Hampshire
Women's sports in New Hampshire